Zamet can refer to:

 Zamèt, a neighborhood in the city of Rijeka, Croatia
 Zamęt, a village in the administrative district of Gmina Łagów, within Świebodzin County, Lubusz Voivodeship, in western Poland